Jay Lockhart (born 3 February 1996) is an Australian rules footballer who last played for the Melbourne Football Club in the Australian Football League (AFL). He joined the team during the 2018 Pre-season supplemental selection period. He made his senior debut against Geelong in round 2 of the 2019 season. He was delisted by Melbourne following the club's drought breaking premiership.

Before joining the Casey Demons Lockhart played for North Launceston Football Club.

Statistics
 Statistics are correct to end of round 15, 2021

|- style="background:#eaeaea;"
! scope="row" style="text-align:center" | 2019
| style="text-align:center" | 
| 41 || 12 || 9 || 3 || 90 || 61 || 151 || 52 || 23 || 0.8 || 0.3 || 7.5 || 5.1 || 12.6 || 4.3 || 1.9
|-
| scope=row | 2020
| style="text-align:center" | 
| 41 || 10 || 0 || 2 || 55 || 33 || 88 || 28 || 19 || 0.0 || 0.2 || 5.5 || 3.3 || 8.8 || 2.8 || 1.9
|- style="background:#eaeaea;"
! scope="row" style="text-align:center" | 2021
| style="text-align:center" | 
| 41 || 0 || – || – || – || – || – || – || – || – || – || – || – || – || – || –
|- class="sortbottom"
! colspan=3| Career
! 22
! 9
! 5
! 145
! 94
! 239
! 80
! 42
! 0.4
! 0.2
! 6.6
! 4.3
! 10.9
! 3.6
! 1.9
|}

References

Notes

Citations

External links

Jay Lockhart from AFL Tables

Melbourne Football Club players
Casey Demons players
1996 births
Living people
Australian rules footballers from Tasmania
North Launceston Football Club players